The third edition of the CCCF Championship was held in Costa Rica.

Final standings

Results

External links
 CCCF Championship on RSSSF Archive

CCCF Championship
CCCF Championship, 1946
International association football competitions hosted by Costa Rica
CCCF
CCCF
1946 in Costa Rica
February 1946 sports events in North America
March 1946 sports events in North America
Sports competitions in San José, Costa Rica
20th century in San José, Costa Rica